Paul Duncan Meyers (November 19, 1895 – July 2, 1966) was an American football player. He played professionally in the National Football League (NFL) with the Rochester Jeffersons, New York Brickley Giants and the Racine Legion. Brickley's New York Giants are not related to the modern-day New York Giants. Prior to joining the NFL, Meyers played college football at the University of Wisconsin.

References

1895 births
1966 deaths
American football ends
Milwaukee Panthers football players
New York Brickley Giants players
Racine Legion players
Rochester Jeffersons players
Wisconsin Badgers football players
Players of American football from Chicago
Players of American football from Milwaukee